The Gary Steelheads were a professional basketball team. They played in the International Basketball League, Continental Basketball Association, and the United States Basketball League. They were based in Gary, Indiana, United States, and played their home games at the Genesis Convention Center. The Steelheads were the 2006 CBA Eastern Conference champions.

History

Gary was awarded a franchise in the CBA in 2000. The league folded so the Steelheads joined the IBL. Former CBA franchise owners purchased the CBA name from the bankruptcy court. The IBL and IBA combined to reform the CBA in 2001. After playing five seasons in the CBA the team announced on July 21, 2006, that they would be sitting out the 2006–07 CBA season.

During that time former owner Jewell Harris Sr. was indicted on federal extortion and other charges unrelated to the team. He resigned from the team pending a sale.

On October 24, the new ownership, Showtime Sports and Entertainment, LLC (headlined by Jewell Harris Jr.), announced they would be moving to the USBL for 2007.

After one season in the USBL, which included multiple teams folding, the Steelheads joined the IBL (unrelated to the former IBL) for the 2008 season. The Steelheads sat out the 2009 season and eventually ceased operations.

Year-by-year

Roster

References

External links 
Team page on IBL website
Gary Steelheads fan site

Sports in Gary, Indiana
Basketball teams in Indiana
Basketball teams established in 2000
Continental Basketball Association teams
Defunct basketball teams in the United States
2000 establishments in Indiana
2008 disestablishments in Indiana
Basketball teams disestablished in 2008
International Basketball League (1999–2001) teams